The North Avenue Historic District is a U.S. historic district (designated as such on October 12, 2001) located in Lake Wales, Florida. The district is along the 100 Block of North Avenue. It contains 12 historic buildings.

References

External links

 Polk County listings at National Register of Historic Places

Lake Wales, Florida
National Register of Historic Places in Polk County, Florida
Historic districts on the National Register of Historic Places in Florida